Mike Mendoza may refer to:
 Mike Mendoza (broadcaster), British radio presenter and politician
 Mike Mendoza (wrestler), Puerto Rican professional wrestler
 Mike Mendoza (baseball), baseball player

See also
 Michael Mendoza, American football quarterback